W.R. Hinkle and Co. is a historic automobile showroom located at South Bend, St. Joseph County, Indiana. It was built in 1922, and is a two-story, rectangular, yellow brick building with terra cotta trim.  It is seven bays wide and has a one-story addition.  It features narrow terra cotta piers that extend into pointed finials.  The building and its owner were featured in the September 23, 1946 edition of Life Magazine.

It was listed on the National Register of Historic Places in 1985.

References

Commercial buildings on the National Register of Historic Places in Indiana
Commercial buildings completed in 1922
Buildings and structures in South Bend, Indiana
National Register of Historic Places in St. Joseph County, Indiana